James Whiting Pennebaker (born March 2, 1950) is an American social psychologist. He is the Centennial Liberal Arts Professor of Psychology at the University of Texas at Austin and a member of the Academy of Distinguished Teachers. His research focuses on the relationship between natural language use, health, and social behavior, most recently "how everyday language reflects basic social and personality processes".

Education and career
Pennebaker received his B.A. in psychology from Eckerd College in 1972 with honors and his Ph.D. from the University of Texas at Austin in 1977.

He has held the following positions:
1977–1983: Assistant Professor of Psychology, Department of Psychology, University of Virginia
1983–1997: Associate and Full Professor, Southern Methodist University; 1995–1997: Chair of Psychology Department
1997–present: Professor, University of Texas at Austin; 2005–2009: Bush Regents Professor of Liberal Arts, 2005–2014: Chair of Psychology Department,
2009–present: Regents Centennial Professor of Liberal Arts
2005–2010: International Research Professor, University of Central Lancashire, Preston, England
2016–2018: Executive Director, Project 2021 to rethink undergraduate education University of Texas at Austin.

Research 
Over the course of his career, Pennebaker has studied the nature of physical symptoms, health consequences of secrets, expressive writing, and natural language, and has received grants from the National Science Foundation, the National Institutes of Health, the Templeton Foundation, the U.S. Army Research Institute, and other federal agencies for studies in language, emotion, and social dynamics.

A pioneer of writing therapy, he has researched the link between language and recovering from trauma and been "recognized by the American Psychological Association as one of the top researchers on trauma, disclosure, and health." In particular, he finds a person's use of "low-level words", such as pronouns and articles, predictive of recovery as well as indicative of sex, age, and personality traits: "Virtually no one in psychology has realized that low-level words can give clues to large-scale behaviors."<ref name=SciAm>Jan Dönges, "What Your Choice of Words Says about Your Personality: A language analysis program reveals personality, mental health and intent by counting and categorizing words", Scientific American Mind, July 2009 (originally titled "You Are What You Say."</ref>

In the mid-1990s, he and colleagues developed the Linguistic Inquiry and Word Count (LIWC; pronounced "Luke"), a computerized text analysis program that outputs the percentage of words in a given text that fall into one or more of over 80 linguistic (e.g., first-person singular pronouns, conjunctions), psychological (e.g., anger, achievement), and topical (e.g., leisure, money) categories. It builds on previous research establishing strong links between linguistic patterns and personality or psychological state, but makes possible far more detailed results than did hand counts. Pennebaker and associates have used this tool to analyze the language of Al Qaeda leaders and of political candidates, particularly in the 2008 United States presidential election. The use of LIWC is widespread. It is commonly used to examine how different groups of people communicate or write, how individuals may differ in their writing across contexts, and is used to detect deception. Pennebaker blogs with associates on what linguistic analysis says about political leaders, at Wordwatchers: Tracking the language of public figures, and Pennebaker Conglomerates, Inc. offers free LIWC-based text analysis tools online, including a language style matching calculator and a language-based application of the Thematic Apperception Test.

In January 2017, Pennebaker was one of the speakers in the Linguistic Society of America's inaugural Public Lectures on Language series.

 Selected publications 

Books
 The Psychology of Physical Symptoms. New York: Springer, 1982. 
 (Ed., with Daniel M. Wegner) Handbook of Mental Control. Englewood Cliffs, New Jersey: Prentice Hall, 1993. 
 Emotion, Disclosure, and Health. Washington, D.C.: American Psychological Association, 1995.  
 Opening up: The Healing Power of Confiding in Others. New York: Morrow, 1990. Repr. Opening Up: The Healing Power of Expressing Emotions. New York: Guilford, 1997. 
 Writing to Heal: A Guided Journal for Recovering from Trauma and Emotional Upheaval. Oakland, California: New Harbinger, 2004. 
 The Secret Life of Pronouns: What Our Words Say About Us''. New York: Bloomsbury Publishing, 2011.

Articles

See also
Self-concealment
Self-disclosure

References

External links 
 James W. Pennebaker homepage , Department of Psychology, University of Texas
 Wordwatchers: Tracking the language of public figures
 In Synch: Language Style Matching, James Pennebaker Conglomerates at Online Research Consortium
 Works by and about James W. Pennebaker at OCLC WorldCat
 Reprints of articles by James W. Pennebaker at Department of Psychology, University of Texas

1950 births
Living people
21st-century American psychologists
People from Midland, Texas
University of Texas at Austin faculty
Psychology educators
Eckerd College alumni
20th-century American psychologists